Epithets of Inanna were titles and bynames used to refer to this Mesopotamian goddess and to her Akkadian counterpart Ishtar. In Mesopotamia, epithets were commonly used in place of the main name of the deity, and combinations of a name with an epithet similar to these common in ancient Greek religion are comparatively uncommon. Inanna had more titles than any other Mesopotamian deity. They pertained to her associations with specific cities or areas, such as Uruk, Zabalam, Akkad, Nineveh, or the Sealand. Others instead highlighted her specific roles, for example, that of an astral goddess personifying the planet Venus—or that of a war deity. In some cases, her individual epithets eventually developed into separate deities.

Overview
In ancient Mesopotamia, epithets could either be used alongside the primary name of a given deity, or instead of it. The latter practice was widespread in religious texts, while standard combinations of a name with an epithet, comparable to these widespread in ancient Greek religion, were relatively uncommon. The primary purpose of such titles was "outlining the essential qualities, activities, functions, genealogy, and hierarchical position of a given deity." The most archaic cuneiform texts from the Uruk period indicate that Inanna was already worshiped under a number of titles in Uruk at the time. According to Frans Wiggermann, she was the Mesopotamian deity with the highest number of such secondary names, with only Nergal having a comparable number of them. Over seventy names of Inanna are listed in the god list An = Anum alone. In various compositions, seven individual names of this goddess could be given at a time. A possible example can be found in the Archive of Mystic Heptads. In one case, a hymn enumerating epithets of Inanna simply refers to them as "names" (mu).

Many of Inanna's epithets start with the words nin or bēlet, both of which can be translated as "lady." Nin is a common element of Sumerian theonyms, which typically combine it with a toponym or another noun. Bēlet analogously occurs in Akkadian ones, not necessarily only in epithets of Inanna, as evidenced by the existence of independent goddesses such as Bēlet-Nagar ("Lady of Nagar") and Bēlet-Apim ("Lady of Apum"). A third common type of similar epithets, starting with Šarrat ("queen"), is first attested in the Old Babylonian period in the northern part of Babylonia. However, titles designating manifestations of various deities associated with specific places are already attested in the Early Dynastic period. The Canonical Temple List, which dates to the second half of the Kassite period, mentions at least seventy nine temples in various parts of Mesopotamia dedicated to Inanna or her various manifestations. Cities associated with her include many of the earliest political powers of Mesopotamia, such as Uruk (where she was the most important deity in the Uruk period already), Kish, Umma or Zabalam. In the middle of the third millennium BCE, she was also fused with the Akkadian goddess Ishtar, the goddess of the city of Akkad, possibly with the support of the Sargonic dynasty which ruled Mesopotamia at the time. Groupings of manifestations of Inanna from various geographic locations occur in god lists, such as the Weidner god list and the Nippur god list. In the former case, the exact selection and order of the manifestation varies between copies, though Inanna of Uruk always occurs first. She also opens an analogous section in An = Anum.

Inanna could also be worshiped in astral and martial forms. The former aspect of her character most likely goes back to her prehistory, as she was already understood as a personification of Venus as both morning and evening star based on her titles present in texts from the Uruk period. In An = Anum the astral epithets have their own sub-section, and are separated from other names of Inanna by a list of her servants. It has been suggested that the role of a warrior was originally exclusive to Ishtar and did not belong to the domain of Inanna, but according to Joan Goodnick Westenholz both of them were already complex deities with many roles before the syncretic merge.

In some cases, epithets of Mesopotamian deities could develop into fully distinct figures. Westenholz noted while this phenomenon, which she refers to as "fission of deities," is attested for various members of the Mesopotamian pantheon, it is the most common for epithets of Inanna. Due to the number of her titles, as well as their frequent association with specific places, it has been speculated that there might have been more than one deity named Inanna. Tonia Sharlach argues that the names Inanna and Ishtar were effectively umbrella terms, and many of the local forms had distinct characters. Westenholz pointed out that a plurality of Inannas (dINANA.MEŠ) was worshiped in the second half of the second millennium BCE. Interpretations of individual forms of Inanna as aspects of one deity or as multiple ones could coexist.

Geographical epithets

Astral epithets

Martial epithets

Other epithets

Epithets from the Nuzi texts
A deity designated by the logogram dIŠTAR is described with various epithets, either linguistically Hurrian or "Hurrianised," in texts from Nuzi. Gernot Wilhelm renders the logogram phonetically as Ishtar, but according to Marie-Claude Trémouille, the deity meant might be Šauška, who was  considered to be her counterpart both in Mesopotamian and Hurrian sources. Volkert Haas used the name "Ištar-Ša(w)oška" to refer to the deity or deities designated by these epithets.

References

Bibliography

 Ulmasitum Annunitum

Mesopotamian goddesses
Inanna
Epithets